Sonoda (written: , ,  or ) is a Japanese surname. Notable people with the surname include:

, Japanese politician
, Japanese judoka
, Japanese footballer
, Japanese professional wrestler
, Japanese badminton player
, Japanese manga artist and character designer
, Japanese manga artist
Nobuhiro Sonoda, Japanese luthier
, Japanese judoka
, Japanese golfer
, Japanese footballer
, Japanese politician
, Japanese footballer
, Japanese politician
, Japanese politician
, Japanese long jumper
, Japanese rugby union player

Fictional characters
, a character from the multimedia franchise Love Live!
, a character from the Kamen Rider Fourze
Yū Sonoda (園田 優), a character from Sakura Trick
Taisei Sonoda (園田 大勢), a character from Komi Can't Communicate

Japanese-language surnames